A jug is a type of container commonly used to hold a liquid.

Jug may also refer to:

Places
 The Jug, an island in West Virginia, United States
 Jug Rock, a natural geological formation outside of Shoals, Indiana, United States
 Jug Sport Hall, an indoor arena in Osijek, Croatia
 Cepotina, a Serbian Army base also known as Jug
 Jug II, a city district of Osijek, Croatia

Slang
 Jugs, a slang term for women's breasts, especially large ones
 Jug, a slang term for prison
 Australian term for an electric kettle, New Zealand term for a kettle

People
 Jug (nickname)
 Jug Suraiya, Indian journalist, author and columnist
 Jug (surname)

Other uses
 Jug, a crossbreed between a Jack Russell terrier and a pug
 Jug, a nickname for the P-47 Thunderbolt fighter aircraft
 VK Jug, a water polo club from Dubrovnik, Croatia
 Jug (instrument), used for rhythmic bass accompaniment
 Jug wine, a term used for inexpensive table wine
 Jug Tavern, a historic structure in Ossining, New York, United States
 Jug (album), by jazz saxophonist Gene Ammons
 Jug fishing, a method of fishing that uses lines suspended from floating jugs

See also
 Juggs, a U.S. soft-core pornographic magazine
 Jugging